Alfonso “Sete” Benavides López de Ayala (born 9 March 1991 in) is a Spanish sprint canoeist, a World and European medallist.

Career 
After winning the bronze medal in the C-1 200 m at the 2011 World Championships, Benavides competed in the 2012 Summer Olympics, he competed in the Men's C-1 200 metres.  A year later, he won bronze in the C-1 200 m at the World Championships.

He was named the Spanish Canoeing Federation's male athlete of the year in 2014.

In 2019, he won bronze in the men's C-2 500 m at the World Championships, with Antoni Segura.

References

External links

Spanish male canoeists
1991 births
Living people
Olympic canoeists of Spain
Canoeists at the 2012 Summer Olympics
Canoeists at the 2016 Summer Olympics
ICF Canoe Sprint World Championships medalists in Canadian
Sportspeople from Mallorca
Canoeists at the 2015 European Games
Canoeists at the 2019 European Games
European Games medalists in canoeing
European Games bronze medalists for Spain
21st-century Spanish people